is a Japanese name for girls. Momo is usually written with the kanji character 桃 for "peach" or 百 for "one hundred" or 杏 for "apricot", followed by -ko, a common suffix for girls' names (meaning "child"). It may refer to:

People
, Japanese actress and model
, Japanese film director
, Japanese ballerina
, Japanese novelist
Momoko Iko (1940–2020), American playwright
, Japanese author and translator of children's books
, Japanese voice actress
, Japanese women's shogi player
, Japanese actress
, Japanese tennis player
, Japanese actress best known for her role as Emiko Yamane in the original Godzilla
, Japanese haiku poet
, Japanese women's professional shogi player
, Japanese wheelchair tennis player
, Japanese professional golfer
, Japanese voice actress from Hyogo, Japan
Momoko Saito (cricketer) (born 1981), Japanese cricketer
, Japanese manga artist from Shimizu, Japan
, Japanese footballer
, Japanese actress
, Japanese actress
, Japanese track and field athlete
, Japanese footballer
, J-pop singer and member of the Hello! Project group Berryz Kobo
, Japanese female professional golfer
, Japanese multi-instrumentalist
, pseudonym of an Eisner Award-winning Japanese comic book artist and writer

Fictional characters
 Momoko (Maskman) (aka Pink Mask), a character in Hikari Sentai Maskman
 Momoko (The King of Fighters), a character in The King of Fighters video game series
 Momoko, a character in Armour of God II: Operation Condor
 Momoko, a character in Momo Kyun Sword
 Momoko, a character in Shangri-La
 Momoko Akatsutsumi, a character in the Demashita! Powerpuff Girls Z anime series
 Momoko Asuka, a character in Ojamajo Doremi, but only in the third and fourth story arcs
 Momoko Hamanaka, a character in The Decay of the Angel
 Momoko Hasegawa, a character in Mop Girl
 Momoko Hoshino, a character in Major
 Momoko Ichihara, a character in Love Get Chu
 Momoko Kanda, a character in Wonder Momo
 Momoko Koigakubo, a character in Ghost Stories
 Momoko Koishikawa, a character in Long Vacation
 Momoko Kuzuryū, a character in Sumomomo Momomo
 Momoko Momohara, a character in Sailor Moon
 Momoko Naitō, a character in Shōjo Sect
 Momoko Ryugasaki, a character in the novel, manga and movie Kamikaze Girls
 Momoko Sakura (aka Maruko-chan), main character of the Japanese anime and manga series Chibi Maruko-chan
 Momoko Suō, a character in The Idolmaster Million Live!
 Momoko Takamachi, a character in Magical Girl Lyrical Nanoha
 Momoko Togame, a character in Magia Record
Momoko, mentally and physically disabled twin sister of nine-year-old Rikki in 2003 animated movie My Sister Momoko
 Wedding Peach (character), also known as Momoko Hanasaki, a character in Wedding Peach
 Momoko Takeuchi, a character in the manga Inubaka
 Momoko Fujikawa, a character in Magical Princess Club
 Momoko Kuramoto, a character in My Sister Momoko
 Momoko Fuller, a character in All Over Creation
 Momoko Yamazaki, a character in The Brave Fighter of Sun Fighbird

See also
 Momoko Doll, a Japanese fashion doll
 Momoko 120%, a 1986 NES game based on the anime Urusei Yatsura released only in Japan

Japanese feminine given names